The 2018 season was the Minnesota Vikings' 58th in the National Football League, their third playing their home games at U.S. Bank Stadium and their fifth under head coach Mike Zimmer.

Following a Week 8 loss to the New Orleans Saints, the team could no longer improve on their 13–3 record from the 2017 season, in which they won the NFC North division and reached the NFC Championship before losing to the eventual Super Bowl LII champion Philadelphia Eagles.

The Vikings failed for the second time in three years to qualify for the playoffs when the Philadelphia Eagles defeated the Washington Redskins in week 17.

Roster changes

Draft

Draft trades

Transactions

Staff

Roster

Preseason
The Vikings' preliminary preseason schedule was announced on April 11.

Game summaries

Week 1: at Denver Broncos

Week 2: vs. Jacksonville Jaguars

Week 3: vs. Seattle Seahawks

Week 4: at Tennessee Titans

Regular season

Schedule

Note: Intra-division opponents are in bold text.

Game summaries

Week 1: vs. San Francisco 49ers

The Vikings began the 2018 season with a home game against the San Francisco 49ers, their first home game since the Minneapolis Miracle in the divisional round of the 2017–18 NFL playoffs. The game saw quarterback Kirk Cousins and defensive tackle Sheldon Richardson make their regular season debuts for the Vikings, as well as the return of second-year running back Dalvin Cook, who had torn his ACL early in the 2017 season. The two teams traded punts to start the game, before the Vikings put a drive together on their second possession, culminating with a 48-yard field goal by rookie kicker Daniel Carlson. The 49ers then failed to pick up a first down on their next possession, giving the Vikings good field position on their own 47-yard line off the ensuing punt as the first quarter drew to a close. Runs by Latavius Murray and a 17-yard pass from Cousins to Cook gave the Vikings a third-and-3 situation on the San Francisco 22-yard-line, from where Cousins threw a 22-yard strike to Stefon Diggs, the 100th touchdown pass of his career. On the ensuing San Francisco possession, quarterback Jimmy Garoppolo linked up with tight end George Kittle and wide receiver Trent Taylor to get them into Minnesota territory, before a pass interference penalty against Vikings cornerback Trae Waynes put the 49ers just outside the red zone; however, the Minnesota defense stood firm and allowed just a 42-yard Robbie Gould field goal; however, on the Vikings' next drive, Cook fumbled the ball at the end of a 15-yard run, allowing San Francisco to regain possession. They marched down to the Vikings' 1-yard line, only for defensive tackle Linval Joseph to force a fumble from running back Alfred Morris, which safety Harrison Smith subsequently recovered. The Vikings were able to get out from under the shadow of their own goalposts and closed out the half with a 10–3 lead.

The Vikings defense forced a three-and-out to begin the second half, but only managed one first down on their ensuing possession before having to punt; however, three plays later, with the 49ers at third-and-8 from their own 20-yard line, the Vikings' rookie cornerback Mike Hughes intercepted a pass from Garoppolo and returned it 28 yards for a touchdown to put the Vikings up 17–3. Garoppolo responded immediately, however, completing a 56-yard pass to fullback Kyle Juszczyk to put the 49ers inside the Vikings' 20. As in the first half, though, the Minnesota defense held up and limited the 49ers to a 33-yard field goal. Cousins focused his attention on his wide receivers to begin the next Vikings possession, completing passes of 11 and 34 yards to Adam Thielen, the latter being the Vikings' longest completed pass of the day, to get into 49ers territory. Cook continued to run the ball, while Cousins' attention shifted to his tight ends, first completing a nine-yard pass to David Morgan II before an 11-yard completion to Kyle Rudolph for the Vikings' third touchdown of the day. A 36-yard completion from Garoppolo to Kittle was the highlight of the subsequent San Francisco drive, which culminated in a 22-yard touchdown pass to rookie wide receiver Dante Pettis with 30 seconds left in the quarter. The Vikings went three-and-out on their next possession; they soon had the ball back, as cornerback Xavier Rhodes intercepted Garoppolo, only to again have to punt, giving San Francisco the ball back at their own 14-yard line. A 39-yard pass from Garoppolo to Pettis got the 49ers into the Vikings' half, but a tackle for a five-yard loss by Smith led to another third-down situation for San Francisco; Garoppolo's third-down pass was incomplete, which should have meant them having to punt, only for Richardson to be flagged for roughing the passer, giving the 49ers a 15-yard advantage and an automatic first down. They were able to get down to the Vikings' 4-yard line, but were unable to get the ball into the end zone and again had to settle for a field goal, reducing the margin to 8 points. The Vikings again had to punt on their next possession, but a 10-yard sack by Smith on the next series meant San Francisco had to do the same, giving the Vikings the ball back with six minutes left to play. A combination of runs from Murray and Cook allowed the Vikings to take three minutes off the clock, but a scramble run from Cousins came up just short of another first down; however, the Vikings were able to draw the 49ers' defense offside, giving them a free five yards and the first down. They were able to take another minute off the clock before punting, giving the 49ers the ball with 1:49 to play. Needing a touchdown to stand a chance of taking the game to overtime, Garoppolo had to go for it, but was intercepted by Smith on the second play of the drive, allowing the Vikings to run out the clock and claim their first win of the season.

Week 2: at Green Bay Packers

Week 2 saw the Vikings travel to Lambeau Field to take on their archrivals, the Green Bay Packers, against whom Vikings linebacker Anthony Barr effectively ended Packers quarterback Aaron Rodgers' 2017 season with a hit that broke Rodgers' collarbone.

The Packers received the ball first and were forced to punt. On the ensuing drive, the Packers forced the Vikings to go three-and-out, but the punt from the Vikings' Matt Wile was blocked by Geronimo Allison and recovered by the Packers' Josh Jackson for a touchdown. On Minnesota's next drive, quarterback Kirk Cousins led the Vikings on an eight-play, 57-yard touchdown drive to tie the game at 7–7, with the scoring pass going to Laquon Treadwell for 14 yards. Green Bay followed that with a nine-yard touchdown pass from Rodgers to Davante Adams early in the second quarter, making the game 14–7. After trading punts and a missed 48-yard field goal for the Vikings by rookie kicker Daniel Carlson, the Packers' Mason Crosby made a 37-yard field goal at the end of the first half to send the Packers to the locker room leading 17–7.

The Vikings received the ball after halftime, but their drive stalled and were forced to punt. Green Bay followed that up with a 40-yard field goal from Crosby with 6:32 left in the third quarter. After trading punts, the Vikings scored another touchdown on a three-yard pass to Stefon Diggs early in the fourth quarter to reduce the Packers' lead to six points. Green Bay followed that up with Crosby's third field goal of the day, this time from 31 yards, but the Vikings responded quickly on their next drive, as Cousins hit Diggs with a 75-yard touchdown pass to make it a 23–21 lead for the Packers. Crosby then made his fourth field goal of the day from 48 yards with 2:13 left in the fourth quarter. Cousins threw an interception on the first play of the Vikings' next drive, leading to a fifth Crosby field goal from 36 yards with 1:45 remaining, putting the Packers up 29–21. Cousins then led the Vikings 75 yards in eight plays, resulting in a 22-yard touchdown pass to Adam Thielen, but the Vikings needed a two-point conversion to tie the game. Cousins then connected with Diggs to tie the game at 29–29, with 31 seconds remaining in regulation. Green Bay was able to move down the field and into field goal range, but Crosby's 52-yard attempt missed left and the game went to overtime.

The Vikings won the overtime coin toss and received the ball. They moved 39 yards in seven plays, but Carlson's 49-yard attempt sailed wide right. Green Bay then was forced to punt after chewing 3:45 off the clock, and the Vikings started their next drive with 3:57 left to play. After moving 63 yards, the Vikings were at the Packers' 17-yard line with four seconds remaining in overtime, but Carlson missed his third field goal attempt of the game, this time from 35 yards, and again wide right. Carlson was waived the next day, replaced by veteran kicker Dan Bailey.

Week 3: vs. Buffalo Bills

Week 4: at Los Angeles Rams

This was the first NFL broadcast in history to have an all-female announcing team (accessible only to Amazon Prime viewers).

Week 5: at Philadelphia Eagles

Week 6: vs. Arizona Cardinals

Week 7: at New York Jets

Week 8: vs. New Orleans Saints
This was a rematch of the Minneapolis Miracle from last year's divisional playoff game. There would be no miracle in this one however, as the Saints won 30-20 as the Vikings fell to 4-3-1.

Week 9: vs. Detroit Lions

Week 11: at Chicago Bears

Week 12: vs. Green Bay Packers

Week 13: at New England Patriots

Week 14: at Seattle Seahawks

Week 15: vs. Miami Dolphins

Week 16: at Detroit Lions

Week 17: vs. Chicago Bears

Standings

Division

Conference

Pro Bowl
Four Vikings players were elected to the Pro Bowl when the rosters were announced on December 18, 2018, with both outside linebacker Anthony Barr and safety Harrison Smith named to their fourth Pro Bowls. Wide receiver Adam Thielen was named to his second Pro Bowl, having received his first nomination in 2017, while defensive end Danielle Hunter received his first Pro Bowl selection.

Statistics

Team leaders

Source: Minnesota Vikings' official website

League rankings

Source: NFL.com

References

External links

Minnesota
Minnesota Vikings seasons
Minnesota Vikings